Anne Victoria Cameron  is a New Zealand medical researcher specialising in molecular endocrinology.

Academic career
Cameron was working as a scientific officer at the Christchurch School of Medicine, University of Otago, when she completed her PhD entitled The Role of Brain Hormones in the Regulation of Hypothalamic-Pituitary Secretion During Acute Haemorrhagic Stress in 1990. After a Fogarty Postdoctoral Research Fellowship-supported postdoc at the Salk Institute, in San Diego, she returned to Christchurch in 1993, rising to full professor.

In the 2017 Queen's Birthday Honours, Cameron was appointed an Officer of the New Zealand Order of Merit, for services to health.

References

External links
 Department homepage
 Lab group homepage

Living people
New Zealand women academics
New Zealand medical researchers
University of Otago alumni
Academic staff of the University of Otago
New Zealand endocrinologists
Women endocrinologists
Year of birth missing (living people)
Officers of the New Zealand Order of Merit